This is a list of defunct airlines of Bulgaria.

See also

 List of airlines of Bulgaria
 List of airports in Bulgaria

References

 
Bulgaria
Defunct airlines
Airlines, defunct